Long Beach, California is a city in Los Angeles County, California, United States.

Long Beach or Longbeach may refer to:

Places

Asia
The Long Beach, a private housing estate in Hong Kong

North America

Canada
Long Beach (British Columbia), part of Pacific Rim National Park Reserve
Long Beach, Kawartha Lakes, Ontario
Long Beach, Newfoundland and Labrador
Long Beach, Niagara Region, Ontario

United States
Related to Long Beach, California:
California State University, Long Beach
Long Beach Airport
Long Beach Boulevard (California), a north–south thoroughfare in Los Angeles County
Long Beach Boulevard (Los Angeles Metro station), a transit rail station in Lynwood, L.A. County
Long Beach Naval Shipyard
Long Beach Search and Rescue
Long Beach Unified School District
Port of Long Beach
Long Beach, Connecticut, a beach in Fairfield County, Connecticut
Long Beach, Indiana
Long Beach Island, New Jersey
Long Beach Island Consolidated School District
Long Beach Township, New Jersey
Long Beach, Maryland, a census-designated place
Long Beach, Minnesota
Long Beach, Mississippi
Long Beach, New York
Long Beach Barrier Island, the island on which the city of Long Beach is located
Long Beach City School District, the island's primary school board
Long Beach (LIRR station), a station of the Long Island Rail Road
Long Beach, North Carolina
Long Beach Peninsula, Washington
Long Beach, Washington, a small town on the southern end of the peninsula

Oceania

Australia
Long Beach, New South Wales, a suburb in Eurobodalla Shire.

New Zealand
Longbeach, New Zealand, a locality in Canterbury
Long Beach, New Zealand, part of Dunedin in Otago

Ships of the United States Navy
 USS Long Beach (CGN-9), the first nuclear-powered guided missile cruiser, serving from 1961 to 1995
 Long Beach-class cruiser, a ship class of the United States Navy with only one member, CGN-9
 USS Long Beach (PF-34), a patrol frigate in use from 1943 to 1945, loaned to the Russian Navy and then in 1962 to the Japan Maritime Self-Defense Force as Shii (PF-17)

Other uses
 Grand Prix of Long Beach, an auto race in Long Beach, California first held in 1975
 Longbeach (cigarette), a brand of cigarettes in Australia
 "Long Beach Iced Tea", a variation of Long Island Iced Tea which substitutes cranberry juice for sours mix; named because of the cranberry bogs near Long Beach Island, New Jersey
 Long Beach Line, a former train route in California, U.S.
 Long Beach Branch, a train line on Long Island, New York